Judy is a short form of the name Judith. 

Judy may refer to:

Places
 Judy, Kentucky, village in Montgomery County, United States
 Judy Woods, woodlands in Bradford, West Yorkshire, England, United Kingdom

Animals
 Judy (dog) (1936–1950), Royal Navy Second World War ship's dog awarded the Dickin Medal
Judy of Punch and Judy (dogs) (fl. 1946), British dog awarded the Dickin Medal
 Judy the Beauty (foaled 2009), Canadian-American racehorse

People and fictional characters
 Judy (given name), a list of people and fictional characters
 Judy (surname)

Music
 Judy (Judy Garland album) (1956)
 Judy (Judy Rodman album) (1986)
 "Judy" (Elvis Presley song) (1961)
 "Judy" (The Pipettes song) (2005)
 "Judy" (Thomas Anders song) (1980)
 "Judy", a song from the album Lost & Found (1961–62) by The Beach Boys
 "Judy", a song from the album On the Double by Golden Earring
 "Judy", a song from Tony Bennett's album When Lights Are Low by Hoagy Carmichael and Sammy Lerner

Magazines
 Judy (satirical magazine), extant 1867–1907
 Judy (girls' magazine), extant 1960–1991

Other uses
 Judy (film), a 2019 biopic about the life of Judy Garland
 Judy, Allied codename for the Japanese Yokosuka D4Y dive bomber aircraft during World War II
 Judy, a colloquial name for a dress form
 Judy's, a defunct chain of clothing stores based in Los Angeles
 Judy, British slang for a girl or woman
 Typhoon Judy, tropical cyclones with the name

See also
 Abisara, a genus of metalmark butterflies commonly known as the Judies
 Judy array, a complex data structure in computer science
 Judy Trust, a Sierra Leonean charity
 Judi
 Judie
 Judith